Ottavio Paravicini (1552–1611) was a Roman Catholic cardinal.

Early life
Born into the noble family from Valtellina, he was the son of Giovanni Michele Paravicini and Lomellina Laudata of Gaeta.

Biography
On 15 Jul 1584, he was consecrated bishop by Charles Borromeo, Archbishop of Milan, with Filippo Sega, Bishop of Piacenza, and Francesco Bossi, Bishop of Novara, serving as co-consecrators.

Episcopal succession
While bishop, he was the principal consecrator of:

and the principal co-consecrator of:
Girolamo Bernerio, Bishop of Ascoli Piceno (1586);
Giovanni Evangelista Pallotta, Archbishop of Cosenza (1587); and
Marcello Lante della Rovere, Bishop of Todi (1607).

References

1552 births
1611 deaths
Apostolic Nuncios to Switzerland
17th-century Italian cardinals
16th-century Italian cardinals